Along with soccer, the sport of futsal in the United States is a rapidly-growing phenomenon.

The Major League Futsal (MLF) is an amateur futsal league. The Professional Futsal League (PFL) was supposed to become the first professional futsal league in the United States in 2018; however, it never began play. There is currently no professional futsal league in the United States, although there is increasing support for one and many regions have their own leagues.

US Soccer is the sport's governing body in the United States. Futsal Across America and New York Futsal have become leaders in Futsal. Leslie Hamer, who represented Falcao in PFL negotiations, has taken the lead in representing coaches and players. Futsal Across America has created developmental Futsal programs for schools, clubs and communities.

The national team has placed runner-up in 1992 and third place in 1989 at the FIFA Futsal World Cup.

On the youth levels, especially in states with colder weather, 5v5 soccer/futsal is commonly played. 

The US also is home to charitable futsal leagues such as the TSC Futsal League which benefits St. Jude Children's Research Hospital. The TSC Futsal League started with 4  before expanding to 9 teams as they are coming up on their fifth season. Chris Dailey, founder of the league, said, "the league is a massive success and has helped raise nearly $2000 for St. Jude. It's truly the beautiful game for a beautiful cause." The teams include the Milkmen Futsal Club, AFC Donuts, Jersey Hooligans, Amigos FC, Pasadena Purple Cows, Las Vegas Fighting Pickles, Ulsan Pancakes Society of Soccer, Midtown Mafia FC, and Minutemen FC.

References